Eduard Wölfflin (1 January 1831, Basel – 8 November 1908, Basel) was a Swiss classical philologist. He was the father of art historian Heinrich Wölfflin.

Career 
From 1848 to 1854, he studied at the Universities of Basel and Göttingen, where he was a pupil of Karl Friedrich Hermann. Following graduation, he worked as an assistant librarian at the University of Basel (1854–61).

He spent the next decade as schoolteacher in Winterthur (1861–71), and in the meantime became an associate professor in Latin philology (1869). In 1871 he attained a full professorship at the University of Zurich. From 1875 to 1880, he was a professor at the University of Erlangen, and from 1880 to 1906, was a professor at the University of Munich. Wölfflin was a member of the Bavarian Maximilian Order for Science and Art.

Published works 
He was a primary catalyst in the establishment of the Thesaurus Linguae Latinae, a comprehensive dictionary of the Latin language — a project that first got underway in 1894. He was also editor of the Archiv für lateinische Lexikographie und Grammatik (from 1884), a periodical that grown to 15 volumes at the time of Wölfflin's death in 1908. Other significant writings by Wölfflin include:
 De Lucii Ampelii libro Memoriali quaestiones criticae et historicae (dissertation). Göttingen 1854.
 Caecilii de Balbi nugis philosophorum quae sunt super, Basel 1855. 
 Polyaeni libri octo strategicon, Leipzig 1860.
 Livianische Kritik und Livianischer Sprachgebrauch, Berlin 1864 – Critical examination of Livy.
 Publii Syri sententiae. Leipzig 1869
 Antiochos von Syrakus und Coelius Antipater, 1872 – Antiochus of Syracuse and Lucius Coelius Antipater. 
 Lateinische und romanische Comparation, 1878 – Latin and Roman comparation.
 Zur Composition der Historien des Tacitus, 1901 – Composition on the histories of Tacitus.

References

External links
 

1831 births
1908 deaths
People from Basel-Stadt
Swiss philologists
Academic staff of the University of Erlangen-Nuremberg
Academic staff of the Ludwig Maximilian University of Munich
Academic staff of the University of Zurich
University of Basel alumni
University of Göttingen alumni